"Don't Close Your Eyes" is a power ballad by the American glam metal band Kix from their fourth studio album, Blow My Fuse (1988). It was written by Bob Halligan Jr., John Palumbo, and Donnie Purnell.

The song remains Kix's most successful single release, peaking at #11 on the Billboard Hot 100.  It is the group's only top 40 hit, resulting in them frequently being called a one-hit wonder.

Track listing
"Don't Close Your Eyes"
"Get It While It's Hot"
"She Dropped Me the Bomb"

Personnel
Steve Whiteman – lead vocals
Ronnie "10/10" Younkins – guitars
Brian "Damage" Forsythe – guitars
Donnie Purnell – bass, keyboards, piano, backing vocals
Jimmy "Chocolate" Chalfant – drums, percussion, backing vocals

Charts

Weekly chart

Sales and certifications

References

External links
Kix's "Don't Close Your Eyes" on Last.fm

1988 songs
1989 singles
Atlantic Records singles
Glam metal ballads
Kix (band) songs
Song recordings produced by Tom Werman
Songs about suicide
Songs written by Bob Halligan Jr.